The Swan with Two Necks is a pub in Pendleton, near Clitheroe, Lancashire, England.

It was CAMRA's National Pub of the Year for 2014.

It is a Grade II listed building.

References

External links

Ribble Valley
Grade II listed buildings in Lancashire
Pubs in Lancashire